State Road 334 in the U.S. state of Indiana was a six-mile (10 km) route in southeastern Boone County.

Route description
State Road 334 connected Interstate 65 (at exit 130) with U.S. Route 421.  Its western terminus was at Indianapolis Road just west of Interstate 65.  It passed through the downtown area of Zionsville.

History
State Road 334 was decommissioned by the Indiana Department of Transportation in the summer of 2011 and turned over to local units of government.  The portion within the Town of Whitestown was turned over to it and the portion within the Town of Zionsville was turned over to it.  The bridges along the route were turned over to Boone County.

Major intersections

References

External links

334
Transportation in Boone County, Indiana
Former state highways in Indiana